Ali Palabıyık (born 4 August 1981) is a Turkish football referee who officiates in the Süper Lig. He has been a FIFA referee since 2015, and is ranked as a UEFA first category referee.

Refereeing career
In 2012, Palabıyık began officiating in the Süper Lig. His first match as referee was on 27 October 2012 between Mersin İdman Yurdu and İstanbul Başakşehir. In 2015, he was put on the FIFA referees list. He officiated his first senior international match on 26 March 2016 between Azerbaijan and Kazakhstan. In 2017, Palabıyık was appointed as an official for the 2017 UEFA European Under-19 Championship in Georgia, his first international tournament as a referee. On 23 October 2019, he officiated his first match in the tournament proper of the UEFA Champions League between RB Leipzig and Zenit Saint Petersburg.

References

External links
 
 
 Ali Palabıyık referee profile at EU-Football.info
 
 

1981 births
Living people
Sportspeople from Ankara
Turkish football referees
21st-century Turkish people